Gerd Gunvor Andersson (born 11 June 1932) is a Swedish film actress. She was born in Stockholm, Sweden and is the sister of Bibi Andersson and the mother of Lars Bethke.

Andersson studied at the Royal Swedish Ballet School and was promoted to principal dancer in 1958. She danced in various classical roles including Giselle and created the main role in Echoing of Trumpets.

Selected filmography
 Summer Interlude (1951)
 Bom the Flyer (1952)
 Secrets of Women (1952)
 The Great Amateur (1958)
 Fanny and Alexander (1982)

References

External links

1932 births
Living people
Actresses from Stockholm
Swedish film actresses
20th-century Swedish actresses
Swedish ballet dancers
20th-century Swedish dancers